Omodeo Tasso or Omodeo de Tassis (XIII Century – 1290) was the late-13th century Italian patriarch of the Thurn und Taxis dynasty generally credited with initiating the first modern postal service as the administrators first of the Imperial Post and later their own postal network.

Omodeo's family was known to have lived in the Val Brembana in Cornello dei Tasso since . The feuding between the Guelf Colleoni and the Ghibelline Suardi in the nearby commune of Bergamo caused them to relocate to the more distant village of Cornello, where Omodeo grew up. Around 1290, after Milan had conquered Bergamo, Omodeo organized 32 of his relatives into the Company of Couriers and linked Milan with Venice and Rome. The recipient of royal and papal patronage, his company was so comparatively efficient that post riders became known as bergamaschi throughout Italy.

Legacy
Under the misspelling "Omedio Tassis", Omodeo figures prominently in the Thomas Pynchon novella The Crying of Lot 49.

See also
 Postal history of Germany
 Princely House of Thurn and Taxis

Notes

References

13th-century Italian nobility
Thurn und Taxis
Postal history of Germany
13th-century Italian businesspeople